Santa Margarida da Coutada is a parish (freguesia) in the municipality of Constância in Portugal. The population in 2011 was 1,788, in an area of 58.72 km².

References

Freguesias of Constância